This list comprises persons who belong to a visible minority group who have been elected to the federal House of Commons, legislative assemblies of provinces and territories, and members appointed to the Senate. Note that the term "visible minority" refers to Canadians who identify as neither white nor indigenous.

The first visible minority elected was Chinese-Canadian Douglas Jung, elected as a Conservative MP to the House of Commons in the 1957 federal election.

There have been 135 visible minorities who have served as Members of Parliament, as well as 23 who have been named senators. After the 2021 Canadian election, the highest number of visible minorities were elected to Parliament in history – with 53 MPs (15.7% of the House of Commons). As of October 2022, of the visible minority members of the 44th Canadian Parliament, 44 are Liberals (43 Liberal MPs, 1 Progressive Senator), 8 are Conservatives (5 MPs, 3 Senators), 3 are New Democrats (3 MPs) and 10 are Independents (2 MPs, 8 Senators).

Provincially, visible minorities have been elected to 12 of the 13 legislatures – with only New Brunswick never having visible minority representation. As of October 2022, there are 93 visible minorities serving in 9 provincial legislatures. Of those members, 47 are Conservatives (25 Progressive Conservative, 11 United Conservative, 6 CAQ, 2 BC Liberal, 2 Saskatchewan Party, 1 Yukon Party), 32 are New Democrats, 18 are Liberals (11 Liberal, 7 Quebec Liberal) and 4 represent Quebec sovereigntist parties (Québec Solidaire).

Federal

House of Commons

Senate

Provincial

Alberta

British Columbia

Manitoba

New Brunswick
New Brunswick has yet to elect a Visible Minority to its legislature.

Newfoundland and Labrador

Northwest Territories

Nova Scotia

Nunavut

Ontario

Prince Edward Island

Quebec

Saskatchewan

Yukon

Visible minorities by assembly composition

House of Commons

Alberta Legislative Assembly

British Columbia Legislative Assembly

Manitoba Legislative Assembly

Newfoundland and Labrador House of Assembly

Northwest Territories Legislative Assembly

Nova Scotia Legislative Assembly

Ontario Legislative Assembly

Quebec National Assembly

Saskatchewan Legislative Assembly

Yukon Legislative Assembly

Visible minorities ever elected to Canadian legislatures by ethnic composition

Municipal (major cities: population over 500,000)

Brampton

Calgary

Edmonton

Hamilton

Mississauga

Montreal

Ottawa

Quebec City

Surrey

Toronto

Vancouver

Winnipeg

See also
List of electoral firsts in Canada
List of Jewish Canadian politicians
List of indigenous Canadian politicians

Notes

References

minority
Members of Canadian provincial and territorial legislatures
Canada